Nicrophorus concolor is a burying beetle described by Kraatz in 1877.

References

Silphidae
Beetles of North America
Beetles described in 1877